Methionine transaminase (methionine-oxo-acid transaminase) is an enzyme with systematic name L-methionine:2-oxo-acid aminotransferase. This enzyme catalyses the following chemical reaction

 L-methionine + 2-oxo carboxylate  2-oxo-4-methylthiobutanoate + L-amino acid

The enzyme is most active with L-methionine.

References

External links 
 

EC 2.6.1